USS Coronado (LCS-4) is an . She is the third ship of the United States Navy to be named after Coronado, California.

Design
In 2002, the US Navy initiated a program to develop the first of a fleet of littoral combat ships. The Navy initially ordered two trimaran hulled ships from General Dynamics, which became known as the Independence-class after the first ship of the class, .  Even-numbered US Navy littoral combat ships are built using the Independence-class trimaran design, while odd-numbered ships are based on a competing design, the conventional monohull . The initial order of littoral combat ships involved a total of four ships, including two of the Independence-class design. These vessels were designed to be outfitted with reconfigurable payloads, called mission packages, which can be changed out quickly. Mission packages are supported by special detachments that will deploy manned and unmanned vehicles and sensors.

Coronado is the second Independence-class littoral combat ship, she was built by Austal USA in Mobile, Alabama. Coronado is the first Independence-class ship to carry standard  rigid-hulled inflatable boats and improvements in corrosion protection and propulsion over the original Independence (LCS-2) design.

History

Construction and initial trials

The ship's keel was laid on 17 December 2009. She was launched and christened during a ceremony in Mobile Bay on 14 January 2012 by the ship's sponsor Susan Keith, the daughter of Eleanor Ring, who christened  in 1966. Fire is a concern on all the Independence-class ships, and the delivery of Coronado was delayed by two fires during her builder's trials. USS Coronado was delivered on 27 September 2013, and she departed the Austal USA shipyard on 27 January 2014, en route to her commissioning site in Coronado, California. She was commissioned on 5 April 2014, and assigned to Littoral Combat Ship Squadron One in San Diego, California.

On 30 April 2014, the LCS Mission Modules (MM) program successfully completed the first Structural Test Firing (STF) of the 30 mm gun mission module aboard Coronado. The test consisted of installing two 30 mm guns, mission package software, and associated test equipment, loading live ammunition, and conducting three live fire scenarios: gun operations; worst case blast loading; and sustained fire. Multiple tracking exercises using high-speed maneuvering surface targets to simulate single and swarm-boat attacks were the following day. Surface warfare tracking and live fire exercises were scheduled in summer 2014, culminating in initial operational test and evaluation in 2015. Coronado is the first Independence-class LCS to undergo firings of the 30 mm cannons of the surface warfare mission package.

In late July 2014, the Navy confirmed Coronado would test-launch the Norwegian Naval Strike Missile in September. Although there is no current requirement for the missile aboard Littoral Combat Ships, it is significantly larger than the AGM-114 Hellfire missile slated to be integrated onto the ship classes, and the Navy is testing its feasibility in an increased anti-surface warfare role for the ships. The test was meant to provide insight into the missile's capabilities, see if it could fit aboard the ship, and review the detect-to-engage sequence of firing a long-range weapon from an LCS. The test occurred on 24 September 2014. The missile was successfully fired from a launcher positioned on ship's flight deck at a mobile ship target.

In mid-August 2014, Coronado demonstrated the ability to rapidly stage and deploy US Marine Corps ground units. Marine Light Attack Helicopter Squadrons 469 and 303 conducted day and night deck-landing qualifications in preparation for an airborne raid. The Independence-class LCS' features of high speed, a large flight deck, and configurable mission bay can support air and small-boat employment and delivery of Marine ground and air tactical units; a small Marine ground unit can be carried with an embarked mission module.

On 16 October 2014, the Navy announced Coronado conducted dynamic interface testing with the MQ-8B Fire Scout unmanned helicopter. The tests familiarized the crew with operating the unmanned aircraft, verified and expanded launch and recovery envelopes, and identified opportunities for envelope expansion to demonstrate future concepts of operations for the aircraft aboard an LCS using the Fire Scout in all three mission packages. Final Contract Trials (FCT) for the ship were completed in June 2014, and Coronado is scheduled to begin Post Shakedown Availability in October 2014.

Active service: 2016–2022

On 19 July 2016, while participating in the Rim of the Pacific Exercise, Coronado conducted a live-fire missile test of a Block 1C Harpoon anti-ship missile. While the missile failed to destroy its target, the test validated the ability to launch high-powered missiles from the forward deck of a littoral combat ship.

On 16 October 2016, Coronado arrived in Singapore for a scheduled rotational deployment to the Indo-Asia-Pacific region. This was the first Independence-class LCS deployment to the region, the first deployment of the MQ-8B fitted with the Telephonics AN/ZPY-4(V)1 radar, and the first deployment of an LCS platform with an over-the-horizon anti-ship capability in the form of a four-cell RGM-84D Harpoon Block 1C missile launcher.

February 2020, the Navy announced the retirement of both Independence and Coronado after ten and six years of service respectively. Evaluations of other Independence-class ships have revealed a further five hulls that are suffering from the same problem, out of the first thirteen vessels of the class. Those other vessels remain in service, albeit with limitations imposed on top speeds in higher sea states.

On 17 March 2020, United States Pacific Fleet reported a crew member of Coronado tested 'positive' for COVID-19, one of the initial ships in the US Navy to report a case. The Coronado crew were at their home port in San Diego, so the sailor quarantined at home. By , a further eight sailors had tested positive and over thirty had been quarantined in an attempt to contain the spread of the virus.

The ship's decommissioning was deferred, and on 18 June 2021, Naval News reported that Coronado would be inactivated in FY 2022 and put on the Out of Commission in Reserve (OCIR) list. Coronado nevertheless took part in Portland Fleet Week 2022, on 8-12 June, along with destroyer , three US Coast Guard cutters and a pair of Royal Canadian Navy ships.

Coronado was decommissioned on 14 September 2022 at San Diego, California. The ceremony’s guest speaker was Rear Admiral Wayne Baze, commander of Expeditionary Strike Group 3.

References

External links 

 Official page 
 

Independence-class littoral combat ships
Ships built in Mobile, Alabama
Coronado, California
2012 ships
Naval ships involved in the COVID-19 pandemic